The Caleb Hyatt House (also known as the Cudner-Hyatt House) is a historic house located at 937 White Plains Post Road in Scarsdale, Westchester County, New York.

Description and history 
It consists of two adjoining structures. The original building was built between 1734 and 1754 and raised to two stories about 1836. It is a wood-framed building, two bays by one bay, on a stone foundation and sheathed in clapboard. The second structure was built prior to 1830. It is a -story, five-by-two-bay, wood-framed building sheathed in clapboard. Also on the property is a small dependency believed to have been a "shoe shop."

It was added to the National Register of Historic Places on January 22, 1973.

See also
National Register of Historic Places listings in southern Westchester County, New York

References

Houses on the National Register of Historic Places in New York (state)
Houses completed in 1754
Houses in Westchester County, New York
1754 establishments in the Province of New York
National Register of Historic Places in Westchester County, New York
Scarsdale, New York